Rava on the Dance Floor is a live album by Italian jazz trumpeter and composer Enrico Rava with Parco della Musica Jazz Lab, performing songs by Michael Jackson recorded in Italy in 2011 and released on the ECM label.

Reception

The Allmusic review by Thom Jurek awarded the album 3½ stars, stating: "On the Dance Floor doesn't come off as one of Rava's more disciplined recordings -- it may indeed be his loosest -- but that's by design. It's a laid-back, accessible tribute recording that celebrates Jackson's music as an achievement, and offers jazz fans of all stripes a way into it." 
 
Writing in The Guardian, John Fordham said: "It sounds like a laid-back jazz group having a party, not a Quincy Jones band nailing every hit, but it's a real tribute, not a lament for lost youth."

The All About Jazz review by John Kelman said that "with Rava on the Dance Floor, the trumpeter and Parco della Musica Jazz Lab manage to retain unmistakable reverence for Jackson's music, even as they take it to places the King of Pop could never have envisaged".

Track listing
All compositions by Michael Jackson except as indicated
 "Speechless" - 6:37   
 "They Don't Care About Us" - 7:54   
 "Thriller" (Rod Temperton) - 6:17   
 "Privacy" (Bernard Belle, LaShawn Daniels, Michael Jackson, Fred Jerkins III, Rodney Jerkins) - 5:43   
 "Smile" (Charlie Chaplin) - 3:29   
 "I Just Can't Stop Loving You/Smooth Criminal" - 9:13   
 "Little Susie" - 3:53   
 "Blood on the Dance Floor" (Michael Jackson, Teddy Riley) - 5:05   
 "History" (James Harris III, Michael Jackson, Terry Lewis) - 8:08

Personnel
Enrico Rava - trumpet
Andrea Tofanelli, Claudio Corvini - trumpet, flugelhorn
Mauro Ottolini - trombone, tuba
Daniele Tittarelli - alto saxophone, flute
Dan Kinzelman - tenor saxophone, clarinet, bass clarinet
Franz Bazzani - keyboard
Giovanni Guidi - piano, Fender Rhodes, toy piano
Dario Deidda - bass
Marcello Giannini - electric guitar
Zeno de Rossi - drums
Ernesto Lopez Maturell - percussion

References

ECM Records albums
Enrico Rava albums
2012 albums
Albums produced by Manfred Eicher
Michael Jackson tribute albums